Dimitar Krasimirov Iliev (born 25 September 1988) is a Bulgarian professional footballer who plays as an attacking midfielder or forward for Lokomotiv Plovdiv, where he is also club captain, and for the Bulgarian national team. He won the Bulgarian Footballer of the Year award in 2019 and 2020.

Career
Iliev began his career in the youth ranks of Lokomotiv Plovdiv. After making his way through the various youth levels at the club, he debuted for the senior team in a 4–1 home win over Lokomotiv Sofia on 11 September 2004, at age of 15. In November 2004, Iliev had a trial spell with Chelsea.

In January 2010, Iliev signed for CSKA Sofia, but struggled to get into the main squad and spent loan spells at Minyor Pernik and Pirin Blagoevgrad, before joining Montana on a permanent basis in August 2011.

After one season with Montana, Iliev joined Lokomotiv Sofia, where he spent two seasons before moving to Poland to sign for Wisła Płock in 2014. In 2015–16, his second season with the club, Iliev helped Wisła achieve promotion to the Ekstraklasa. He spent three full seasons with Wisła before moving to Podbeskidzie Bielsko-Biała in 2017 where he spent one season.

On 16 July 2018, Iliev re-joined Lokomotiv Plovdiv, signing a two-year contract. At the end of the season he lifted the Bulgarian Cup as a captain of his childhood team. The 1–0 win against local rivals Botev Plovdiv was achieved with the only goal in 73rd minute scored by Alen Ožbolt (assist by Ante Aralica and pre-assist by Iliev himself). It happened to be the first Bulgarian Cup trophy for Lokomotiv as well as the 1st ever trophy in Iliev's career. On 2 August 2020, Iliev scored a last-minute goal against Ludogorets Razgrad, helping his team to a 1–0 win and a Bulgarian Supercup triumph.

International career
In November 2019 Iliev received his first call up to the national team for the friendly match against Paraguay and the UEFA Euro 2020 Qualification match against the Czech Republic, but remained an unused substitute for both games. He earned his first cap on 26 February 2020, playing the first half of the 0–1 home loss against Belarus in a friendly game.

Career statistics

International goals
Scores and results list Bulgaria's goal tally first.

Honours

Club
Lokomotiv Plovdiv
 Bulgarian Cup: 2018–19, 2019–20
 Bulgarian Supercup: 2020

Individual
 Bulgarian Footballer of the Year: 2019, 2020
Best forward in the  Bulgarian First League: 2019
Best youth forward in the  Bulgarian First League: 2006
Best Footballer of Plovdiv: 2019, 2020, 2021

References

External links
  Lokomotiv Plovdiv profile
 
 

1988 births
Living people
Bulgarian footballers
Bulgaria international footballers
Bulgaria youth international footballers
First Professional Football League (Bulgaria) players
Ekstraklasa players
PFC Lokomotiv Plovdiv players
PFC CSKA Sofia players
PFC Minyor Pernik players
OFC Pirin Blagoevgrad players
FC Montana players
FC Lokomotiv 1929 Sofia players
Wisła Płock players
Podbeskidzie Bielsko-Biała players
Expatriate footballers in Poland
Bulgarian expatriate sportspeople in Poland
Association football forwards
Bulgaria under-21 international footballers
Footballers from Plovdiv